The tenth annual 2009 US Virgin Islands Paradise Jam was a women's basketball tournament that took place November 26–28, 2009. Eight teams from the NCAA were invited to participate in the tournament. The teams were separated into two brackets, the Reef Division and the Island Division. The Reef Division consisted of Mississippi State, Rutgers, Southern California and Texas. The Island Division consisted of Notre Dame, Oklahoma, San Diego State and South Carolina

Reef Division

Schedule

 Games were played at the U.V.I. Sports and Fitness Center, the Caribbean's premier basketball facility located in Charlotte Amalie, U.S. Virgin Islands.

Final standings

 Indicates team advanced directly to the championship game

 Indicates team advanced to the semifinal game

All Stars
 MVP: Brianna Butler, Syracuse
 Brittney Sykes, Syracuse
 Courtney Walker, Texas A&M
 Brady Sanders, Texas
 Ariel Hearn, Memphis

Island Division

Schedule

Final standings
 Indicates team advanced directly to the championship game
 Indicates team advanced to the semifinal game

All Stars
 MVP:  Skylar Diggins – Notre Dame
 Danielle Robinson (Oklahoma)
 Amanda Thompson (Oklahoma)
 Valerie Nainima (South Carolina)
 Melissa Lechlitner (Notre Dame)
 Jene Morris (SDSU)

See also
Paradise Jam Tournament

References

External links
Official Site

+
2009 in United States Virgin Islands sports
Paradise Jam